Dad is a village in Komárom-Esztergom county, Hungary.

Location 
The village is located on the north eastern part of the Vértes Mountains.

External links
 Street map (Hungarian)

Populated places in Komárom-Esztergom County